In geometry, an icosidodecahedral prism is a convex uniform polychoron (four-dimensional polytope).

It is one of 18 convex uniform polyhedral prisms created by using uniform prisms to connect pairs of parallel Platonic solids or Archimedean solids.

Alternative names 
 Icosidodecahedral dyadic prism (Norman W. Johnson) 
 Iddip (Jonathan Bowers: for icosidodecahedral prism) 
 Icosidodecahedral hyperprism

External links 
 
 

4-polytopes